Glenford may refer to:

 Glenford (name)
 Glenford, Alberta
 Glenford, New York
 Glenford, Ohio

See also
 
 Glenn Ford (disambiguation), including Glen Ford